Fednav is a privately owned group of Canadian companies, divisions, and subsidiaries in the maritime transport industry.  Primarily involved in transporting over 30 million tonnes of bulk cargo and break bulk cargo worldwide, the company is also involved in vessel servicing and cargo handling.

Fednav Limited is Canada's largest ocean-going, dry-bulk shipowning and chartering company. It primarily is engaged in transporting bulk cargo and breakbulk cargo worldwide. Its fleet comprises close to 115 owned, long-term chartered, and spot chartered vessels and includes most of St. Lawrence Seaway-max-sized bulk carriers, Supramax, and Panamax vessels.

Business units and subsidiaries
The core companies include Fednav Limited, Fednav International Ltd., Federal Marine Terminals, Inc. (FMT), Fednav Atlantic Lakes Line (FALLine), Fednav Direct and Arctic Operations, Projects, and Ice Services. The company is headquartered in Montreal with offices in Tokyo, Antwerp, Hamburg, Rio de Janeiro, Singapore, Barbados  and Charlotte. Fednav Limited is the parent company of Fednav International Ltd. and Enfotec Technical Services Inc.

The company is primarily known as an owner and charterer of ships.  According to the company, its main business is marine transportation of dry bulk and breakbulk cargoes worldwide. The company has expertise in ship transport in the Canadian Arctic and in ice navigation services. It also provides off-ship services such as stevedoring services at terminals owned and operated by its subsidiary, FMT. As of 2020, FMT operates a total of 12 terminals throughout the United-States and Canada, including at the Port of Hamilton. Fednav has a commercial office in Charlotte. It also provides logistics services such as warehousing and ground transportation through its other subsidiary Fednav Direct.

In June 2020, Fednav restructured its "traditional Chartering and Operations teams with their counterparts in the Shipowning, Technical, and Arctic units" into one parent.

Fleet

As of 2020, Fednav owns a fleet of 64 ships built between 1978 and 2019. Two of the ships are registered in Canada, three in Barbados, and 60 in the Marshall Islands.

The rest of Fednav's fleet consists of 40 to 60 short- and long-term charters depending on the time of year. The current 20 long-term chartered ships were built between 2005 and 2018. One of these ships is registered in Hong Kong, eleven in Panama, five in Singapore and, three in the Marshall Islands. The company currently has 11 new ships on order, of which, 5 will be owned, scheduled for delivery between 2019 and 2021. The total DWT of the owned and long-term chartered fleet is 3,306,724 DWT with an average age of 9 years.

Many of the ships in the Fednav fleet are strengthened for navigation in ice. It operates in locations such as the Beaufort Sea and Bent Horn at latitude 76°77′ north. Most of its vessels have been classified with the Ice Class 1C* notation by Det Norske Veritas. This allows them to work in the Canadian Arctic with the assistance of icebreakers. Three vessels in the Fednav fleet, 1978-built , 2006-built , and 2014-built  are fitted with icebreaker bows and have enough ice-strengthening and installed power to operate independently in Arctic ice conditions. In 2018, Fednav ordered a fourth icebreaking cargo vessel to eventually replace the MV Arctic. The Polar Class 4 ship is scheduled for delivery in 2020. The company is equipped to operate unescorted in Arctic waters year round, servicing Northern mines of nickel, zinc, lead, copper, and iron ore, among other things.

Fednav vessels operating in the arctic are required to have specially trained ice advisors on board.  Ice advisors advise the ship's master in issues such as minimizing ice accretion.

Notes

References

External links

Company Profile at Det Norske Veritas

Dry bulk shipping companies
Shipping companies of Canada
Companies based in Montreal
Transport companies established in 1944
Canadian companies established in 1944